Judith Barrie (born Catherine Brown; March 1907January 9, 1991) was an American actress and model who appeared in four films between 1930 and 1932, retiring after her brief marriage to producer Edward Halperin.

Biography
Born Catherine Brown and raised in Sacramento, Barrie was the granddaughter of a wealthy wheat merchant in California. Her father was Fred Brown, and her mother, Eva Brown, of Lincoln, California. She had one older sister, Hermia (born 1906). She graduated from Miss Head's School, a girls' boarding school in Berkeley.  After graduating, she worked as a model in New York City, and became a muse of artist James Montgomery Flagg. While in New York, she also performed professionally as a concert pianist.

While modeling, Barrie was noticed by producer Edward Halperin (brother of director Victor Halperin) who suggested to her that she seek a career in film. After appearing in her feature debut in Party Girl (1930) opposite Douglas Fairbanks, she served as a model for the life-size bronze statue used to welcome visitors at the 1932 Summer Olympics in Los Angeles. She subsequently appeared in Ex-Flame (1930), and the Western The Last Frontier (1932). She was then cast in a lead role opposite Tom Mix in the Western Hidden Gold (1932).

Barrie was married to Edward Halperin from 1928 until 1932, when he filed for divorce, claiming she did not love him. She subsequently married Norman Coit Lee, a broker from New York City, on August 25, 1933 in Reno, Nevada. After her marriage to Lee, Barrie formally retired from acting.

Filmography

Notes

References

Sources

External links

1907 births
1991 deaths
Actresses from Sacramento, California
Female models from California
20th-century American women